The siege of Nubl and al-Zahraa during the Syrian civil war was laid by rebels to capture two Syrian government-held towns north of Aleppo, after they had seized most of the northern countryside in July 2012. The siege was lifted on 3 February 2016, as a result of a Syrian government offensive.

Background

Fighting in the Aleppo Governorate began on 10 February 2012. Over the next five months, major clashes left large parts of the rural countryside under rebel control, while the provincial capital, Aleppo city, remained firmly under government control. On 19 July 2012, rebel forces stormed the city and the battle for Aleppo began, which reached a stalemate by September that dragged on over the following years, with the city divided between the two opposing forces.

Siege

The majority-Shiite towns of Nubl and al-Zahraa, with a combined population of 35,000–60,000, were placed under siege by the opposition group the Free Syrian Army (FSA), starting in July 2012. Movement out of Nubl was severely curtailed and relied on goods being airlifted by the Syrian Army. Although relations between the inhabitants of Nubl and the surrounding villages were normally friendly, during the ongoing Syrian Civil War, anti-government supporters from nearby Sunni villages claimed that Nubl and al-Zahraa hosted pro-government militias that launched attacks against opposition supporters. There were numerous tit-for-tat kidnappings between Nubl and pro-opposition villages in the vicinity. After months of rebel siege and continuous reciprocal kidnappings, popular committees in the two towns agreed to begin negotiations with Sunni rebels on 27 March 2013. The agreement to negotiate was organised by Kurdish parties from the neighbouring Kurd Dagh region, controlled by the Kurdish-led PYD. The talks were to be brokered by Kurds, and several kidnapped individuals had been freed on both sides. Over the following years, the only land route that brought some food and essential goods came from the Kurdish-held town of Afrin, to the north.

In mid-2013, 125 Hezbollah fighters were sent via helicopters to reinforce the government defenses.

In February 2014, al-Qaeda's al-Nusra Front and other Islamist groups captured the al-Ma’amel industrial area in the south of al-Zahraa.

On 23 November 2014, the al-Nusra Front, along with other Islamist factions, started a three-front assault on the two towns and seized the industrial area southeast of al-Zahraa. They also advanced into the eastern outskirts of Nubl, which they targeted with dozens of mortar shells and dozens of hell cannon shells, after capturing buildings that were part of the first government line of defense. Beside the regular government troops, the towns were defended by its villagers. By the next day, both areas were recaptured by government forces. Between eight and 43 rebels were killed during the two-day offensive.

On 8 January 2015, a new rebel offensive, led by the al-Nusra Front, was launched against Nubl and Al-Zahraa. The first attack wave succeeded in breaking the first defensive line in both East Nubl and South Al-Zahraa in the factory area and lasted during the night. The attack was repelled by NDF and Hezbollah troops leading to the death of 14 rebels and 11 pro-government fighters. The rebels also lost four tanks, three of which were seized. Before being forced to retreat from the eastern part of Nubl, the rebels managed to capture the town's first and second roundabouts. During the fighting, a series of air raids reportedly destroyed rebel reinforcement convoys coming from Al-Maayer. The next day, according to pro-government sources, a second attack was also repelled. By 14 January, the military secured Nubl and claimed that al-Nusra suffered 250 dead during the offensive.

In mid-February, the Syrian Arab Army and its allies launched a major offensive in the northern Aleppo countryside, with the aim of cutting the last rebel supply routes into Aleppo city, and relieving the rebel siege of Nubl and Al-Zahraa. They quickly captured several villages, but bad weather conditions and an inability to call up reinforcements stalled the government offensive. A few days later, the rebels launched a counter-offensive, retaking two of four positions they had lost to Syrian government forces.

During the fighting in February 2015, 18 members of the Iraqi Shiite militant group Harakat Hezbollah al-Nujaba were reportedly killed while defending Nubl and Al-Zahraa.

On 17 April 2015, the NDF and Hezbollah recaptured the al-Ma'amel industrial area and by 19 April, Syrian government sources reported that 44 rebels and 12 soldiers had been killed. From October, the Iranian Air Force began to airdrop supplies for Nubl and al-Zahraa using two Lockheed C-130 Hercules.

On 1 February 2016, a new offensive was launched by the military to reach Nubl and Al-Zahraa. By 2 February, they had captured three villages and part of a fourth, advancing to within three kilometers of the two besieged towns. Throughout 1 and 2 February, 320 air-raids were conducted against the rebels. At the same time, Hezbollah and government fighters from Nubl and Al-Zahraa launched their own assault and reportedly managed to gain  some ground on the outskirts of the nearby town of Bayanoun. On 3 February, the military had finally broken the rebel siege on the two Shiite towns, after securing the village of Mu’arrassat al-Khan, where the approaching force and fighters trying to break out from the two towns linked up. The pro-opposition SOHR reported the advance, which also cut the last northern rebel supply route from Turkey to Aleppo city, was assisted by "heavy" Russian air strikes. An opposition politician described the government's encirclement of Aleppo as a "horrible development", while in contrast the mayor of Nubl stated the rebel siege was "cruel and caused much hardship". More than 100 rebels, 64–66 soldiers and 18–45 civilians were killed during the operation. Among the dead were 11 rebel commanders, 20 pro-government fighters from the two towns and 14 Iranian IRGC members, including Iranian 2nd Brigadier General Mohsen Ghajarian. In all, more than 500 Russian and Syrian air-strikes and barrel bombs hit rebel positions during the two-day offensive.

The following day, the military advanced further and captured the town of Mayer, adjacent to Nubl and Al-Zahraa, as well as reportedly Kafr Naya. Meanwhile, further north, the Kurdish YPG seized two villages from the rebels.

See also
Battle of Aleppo (2012–2016)

References

Works cited

External links

Defenders of Al-Nobbol and Al-Zahra – Press TV documentary
Aleppo Governorate frontline maps 

Aleppo Governorate in the Syrian civil war
Nubl and Al-Zahraa
Nubl and Al-Zahraa
Military operations of the Syrian civil war in 2013
Military operations of the Syrian civil war in 2014
Military operations of the Syrian civil war in 2015
Military operations of the Syrian civil war in 2016
Military operations of the Syrian civil war involving the Free Syrian Army
Military operations of the Syrian civil war involving the al-Nusra Front
Military operations of the Syrian civil war involving the Syrian government
Military operations of the Syrian civil war involving Quds Force
Military operations of the Syrian civil war involving Russia
Military operations of the Syrian civil war involving Hezbollah
Military operations of the Syrian civil war involving the Islamic State of Iraq and the Levant
Military operations of the Syrian civil war involving Iran